The Paris Visite is a discount travel card aimed mainly at tourists visiting Paris for a few days.

Fares and ticketing

The pass can be bought for 1, 2, 3 or 5 consecutive days for public transport zones 1-3 or 1-5 (includes airport transport).

Once purchased, it allows free travel in on the Paris Métro, the RER, the RATP and the Optile, and also the Montmartre funicular.

Choice of ticket
Zones 1 to 3 will cover most tourists who intend to spend most time in the city centre. For more out-of-town destinations, a ticket covering the  may be better value. These tickets also cover travel on the Roissybus and the Orlyval to and from the two main Paris airports, Paris Orly and Charles de Gaulle Airport.

The local transport authority (STIF) has systematically reduced the number of fare zones, and from mid-July 2011 the STIF combined that with Zone 5.

References

Transport in Île-de-France
Fare collection systems in France